West Wilkes High School (formerly Millers Creek High School) is a public high school (grades 9–12) located in Millers Creek, North Carolina. It is a part of the Wilkes County Schools system. The school's enrollment is typically around 700 students. The school's district includes the western communities of Wilkes County, including Millers Creek, Cricket, Mount Pleasant, Parsonsville, and Wilbar. The current principal is Mrs. Amanda Pruitt and assistant principal is Dan Prouty.

On October 17, 2011 former President Barack Obama visited West Wilkes and gave a speech in the school gymnasium as part of his North Carolina, Virginia bus tour promoting the American Jobs Act.

Academics
A normal school day consists of four 100-minute periods, 10 minute breaks before 2nd period and 4th period, and two 30 minute lunch periods between second and third period. Between the other non-mentioned periods there is a 5 minute break.

The school offers career preparation classes and college preparation classes. It offers Honors Mathematics, English, History, and Science courses. West Wilkes also offers Advanced Placement courses in subjects such as English and History. The language department offers courses in Spanish, Latin, and French. West Wilkes is fully accredited by the Southern Association of Colleges and Schools, also known as SACS.

Fine Arts

Fine Arts is a large commitment at West Wilkes. Fine Arts at West Wilkes include Band, Dance, Theater, and Chorus. As of the 2011–2012 school year the West Wilkes Band had 65 members, and continues to grow. Among the band's achievements are performing at the Daytona 500 (2010), receiving Superior Scores and first place overall 1A Band in the Husky Vanguard Invitational Marching Band Festival (2011), and performing for President Barack Obama during his visit to the school (2011). The West Wilkes dance team, known as the "Struttin' Hawks," have attended many competitions, including the UDA National Dance Team Championship at Walt Disney World, where they placed 2nd in the competition, and the American Cheer and Dance Competition in Atlanta, Georgia, where they finished in 1st place.

Athletics
West Wilkes sports mascot is the Blackhawks. West Wilkes is a member of the North Carolina High School Athletic Association and is classified as a 2A school. The school is a member of the Foothills 2A Athletic Conference, which 2A schools from Wilkes County and neighboring Surry & Yadkin counties in North Carolina. The school's colors are Orange and Black.

Student Body 
The school is controversial among students for its methods of punishment. Primarily the controversy stems from the removal of breaks and lunch periods as an incentive for good behavior from students when they act out of order.

See also
List of high schools in North Carolina

References

http://ncmat.com/09-10/st/2010_Complete.pdf
http://ncmat.com/09-10/1adual.html

External links
 

Public high schools in North Carolina
Schools in Wilkes County, North Carolina